The Masonic Building in Fort Benton, Montana, also known as Sharps Store or Benton Pharmacy, was built in 1882.  It was listed on the National Register of Historic Places in 1980.

It is a two-story  brick building, built for the Masonic Lodge which had been chartered in 1880.  It was built at cost of $16,000, with about $6,000 of that borrowed.  Sale of the building was forced after the Masons could not make their payment on the borrowed funds in c.1887.  The Masonic Lodge continued to rent the second floor until 1901.

The building was for a time the meeting hall for Benton Lodge #25, but the lodge now meets elsewhere

References

Clubhouses on the National Register of Historic Places in Montana
Former Masonic buildings in Montana
National Register of Historic Places in Chouteau County, Montana
1882 establishments in Montana Territory
Masonic buildings completed in 1882